Barby is a village and civil parish about  north of Daventry in Northamptonshire, England. The 2011 Census recorded the parish population as 2,336. Barby is located right off the M45 motorway a short spur from the M1 motorway to the A45 Trunk Road.

Rains Brook, a tributary of the River Leam, forms the parish and county boundary northwest of the village.

Barby's toponym comes from the Old Norse Bergbýr, meaning "hill dwelling".

Archaeology
North of the village is a Norman motte and earthworks but no bailey. It is called Barby Castle but is really the site of an early fortified manor house. The abandoned village of Onley is in the north-west of the parish.

Parish church
The oldest part of the Church of England parish church of St Mary is a Saxon window west of the south doorway. The windows in the north wall of the chancel were inserted about 1300, which is when the west tower was built. The church is a Grade II* listed building.

The tower has a ring of five bells. The third bell was cast at Leicester in about 1599. Hugh II Watts, who had foundries at Leicester and Bedford, cast the second bell in 1622. Mears and Stainbank of the Whitechapel Bell Foundry cast the treble bell in about 1871. John Taylor & Co of Loughborough cast the fourth and tenor bells in 1922. At the same time Taylor's also cast the sanctus bell.

Barby Rectory was built in 1869. St Mary's is part of a single benefice with St Faith's, Kilsby.

Economic and social history

In 1774 it opened from Bedworth in Warwickshire as far south as Napton-on-the-Hill. The canal reached Oxford at the end of 1789.

South of Barby village is an early 19th-century former tower mill, which has been converted into a private home.

Its nearest railway station was at Willoughby Wharf. The railway station was renamed twice, the second time in 1938 when the London and North Eastern Railway renamed it .

British Railways closed Braunston and Willoughby railway station in 1957. In 1963 The Reshaping of British Railways report recommended that British Railways close the railway, which it did in 1966.

Amenities

The village has a Church of England primary school. There are a general shop and post office, a garden centre, a village hall and a children's play area.

Barby Cricket Ground is in Longdown Lane opposite the windmill. The club plays in the Warwickshire League and has men's, women's and junior sides.

Stagecoach in Warwickshire bus route 10 runs hourly between Rugby and Daventry via Barby. It also has a pub, the Arnold Arms.

Twin village
Since 1995 the village has been twinned with Vulaines-sur-Seine in France.

References

Sources

External links

Barby & Onley Parish Council

Civil parishes in Northamptonshire
Villages in Northamptonshire
West Northamptonshire District